Stojan Kočov (25 December 1930 - 5 January 2023) is a Macedonian historian, scientist and publisher. From 1946 to 1949 he fought as Partisan in Democratic Army of Greece during Greek Civil War and also participated in the ethnic Macedonian communist organizations in northern Greece (NOF). After the defeat of the communists in the Civil War, Kochov fled to the Soviet Union where he lived and studied from 1950 to 1957. In 1957 he emigrated to SR Macedonia. Stojan Kočov is one of the most active researchers of the participation of the Macedonian people in the Greek Civil War and has published many books related to the subject.

Some of Stojan Kočov's most famous works:

 Идеолошкиот активизам над Македонците под Грција (The ideological activism of Macedonians in Greece)
 Ѓорѓи Пејков - Македонскиот воин низ историјата на ДАГ (1945–1949) (George Pejkov - The Macedonian warrior throughout the history of DAG (1945-1949))
 Мртвото лице на војната (The death face of war)
 Средба (Meeting)
 Една мртва војска (One dead army)

References 

1930 births
Living people
Macedonian communists
Yugoslav historians
Slavic speakers of Greek Macedonia
People granted political asylum in the Soviet Union
People from Florina